First Security Corporation was a multistate bank holding company in the western United States, primarily in Utah, Idaho, New Mexico, Oregon, Nevada, and Wyoming. Headquartered in Salt Lake City, Utah, First Security merged with Wells Fargo in 2000.

History

David Eccles who emigrated to Utah from Scotland in 1863 had a founding interest in Utah International, which was later inherited by Marriner and George Eccles.  The two sons, together with Marriner A. Browning, expanded their financial interests to 17 banks and a building and loan company, later brought under one holding company, First Security Corporation, in June 1928.

In 1932, First Security acquired Deseret National Bank, which had been founded in 1871 by Brigham Young.  It then moved its headquarters from Ogden to Salt Lake City.

In 2000, First Security was absorbed into Wells Fargo. First Security stockholders received 0.355 of a share of Wells Fargo common stock in exchange for each share of First Security common stock.

References

Defunct banks of the United States
Banks established in 1928
Banks disestablished in 2000
1928 establishments in Utah
Companies based in Ogden, Utah
2000 mergers and acquisitions